The following lists events that happened during 1867 in Chile.

Incumbents
President of Chile: José Joaquín Pérez

Events

Births
9 April – Chris Watson (d. 1941)
5 July – Luis Altamirano (d. 1938)
30 August – William Price (d. 1924)

Deaths
date unknown - José Anacleto Montt Goyenechea (b. 1802)
3 November - Segundo Ruiz Belvis (b. 1829)

References 

 
1860s in Chile
Chile
Chile
Years of the 19th century in Chile